The Denver Regional Council of Governments (DRCOG) is a nonprofit, membership organization of local governments in the Denver region of the state of Colorado. DRCOG is the designated metropolitan planning organization (MPO) and the Transportation Planning Region (TPR) for the region, as well as the Area Agency on Aging (AAA).

Extent
DRCOG covers a region that includes Adams, Arapahoe, Boulder, Broomfield, Clear Creek, Denver, Douglas, Gilpin and Jefferson counties and the southwest portion of Weld County.

History and Organization
DRCOG was officially formed on February 15, 1955, to bring a regional perspective to discussions about the metro area's most pressing problems and to address those concerns through cooperative local government action. The voluntary association continues to offer opportunities for local officials to work together on regional issues, such as growth and development, transportation, the environment, water quality, and older adult services.

More than 50 metro area local county and municipal governments are members of DRCOG. Each jurisdiction appoints a representative to the DRCOG Board of Directors. The Board is composed of elected officials (county commissioners, mayors, city council, or town board members), as well as three nonvoting members designated by Colorado's governor. Board officers serve one-year terms starting each February. The Board meets monthly to discuss and act on regional issues. The Board allows time for public comment at each meeting, and holds regular public hearings.

A number of standing committees also meet regularly, and ad-hoc committees are convened as necessary.

Program Areas

DRCOG's primary program areas include: 
Regional planning: DRCOG is the regional planning commission for the Denver metro area. Since its creation, DRCOG has prepared regional plans. Metro Vision is the region's current plan to guide growth, transportation, and environmental quality to 2035. Metro Vision, first adopted in 1997, is the foundation of the regional council's long-range planning activities. The Mile High Compact is a voluntary intergovernmental agreement through which local governments manage growth by adhering to Metro Vision principles. A number of planning awards have recognized Metro Vision and the Mile High Compact.
Regional data and maps: DRCOG produces a variety of information to support the planning and policy decisions that shape the region, including mapping; population, housing, and economic estimates; environmental data; etc. DRCOG collaborates with its member governments and other public-sector entities to routinely produce high-quality digital aerial photography for the region.
Transportation planning: As the region's MPO, DRCOG works with the Colorado Department of Transportation (CDOT), the Regional Transportation District, the Regional Air Quality Council and others to prepare transportation plans and programs, and to monitor transportation effects on air quality. DRCOG serves as the TPR in developing plans for the mountains and plains areas of the region. DRCOG also performs traffic signal coordination, travel forecasting, etc.
Transportation demand management: Since 1975, DRCOG has offered Denver metro area residents commuting assistance. Beginning as a carpool matching service, DRCOG's services now include carpool and vanpool matching, school carpool matching, teleworking assistance, and other alternative transportation programs to help commuters avoid traffic congestion and reduce pollution. In 2008, DRCOG won a creative excellence award from the Association for Commuter Transportation for a targeted telework business assistance program.
Area Agency on Aging: DRCOG plans and coordinates a continuum of services available to older adults living in the Denver metro area (excluding Boulder County and southwest Weld County). DRCOG assesses the needs of the region's seniors and develops strategies to meet those needs, while allocating federal Older Americans Act funds to service providers in the region. The Ombudsman Program works to serve the needs and protect the rights and dignity of residents of the region's long-term care facilities, such as nursing homes and assisted living facilities. 
Water Quality: DRCOG was undesignated as the regional water quality planning agency by Governor John Hickenlooper in February 2011. Prior to that, State and federal statutes gave DRCOG responsibility for regional water quality planning, except for southwest Weld County. DRCOG oversaw all regional water quality issues, dealing with rivers, streams, lakes, reservoirs, wetlands, and groundwater systems. Regional issues include watershed quality trends, standards and classifications, wastewater treatment and disposal practices, groundwater quality, recharge zones, land use patterns, wetland protection, non-point source pollution, storm water runoff, urban lakes, water supply, and other environmental constraints.
Transit-Oriented Development: Since the passage of FasTracks, DRCOG has served as a resource for the region as it plans for and implements transit-oriented development (TOD). TODs are pedestrian-friendly, mixed-use developments, located within a half-mile of a transit stop, designed to allow residents and workers to drive their cars less and ride transit more.

See also
Colorado census statistical areas
Colorado Department of Transportation
Colorado metropolitan areas
Metropolitan planning organization
Colorado

Notes

References

External links
Denver Regional Council of Governments

Regional Air Quality Control

Metropolitan planning organizations
Local government in Colorado
Denver metropolitan area
Councils of governments